Freestyle skiing at the 2003 Asian Winter Games took place in the Ajigasawa Ski Area located in the town of Ajigasawa, Aomori Prefecture, Japan with two events contested — one each for men and women. This was the second time that freestyle skiing events were included in the official Winter Asiad program; the first time was in the 1999 Harbin Winter Asiad which included only aerial events.

Schedule

Medalists

Medal table

Participating nations
A total of 13 athletes from 3 nations competed in freestyle skiing at the 2003 Asian Winter Games:

References
Results FIS

External links
Results of the Fifth Asian Winter Games

 
2003 Asian Winter Games events
2003
Asian Winter Games